ARA Santa Cruz was an auxiliary ship of the Argentine Navy, built in the Fairfield Shipbuilding & Engineering Shipyard, Govan, Scotland, in 1921. She was transferred to the YPF tanker fleet after arrival in Argentina, and remained in YPF service until decommissioned and scrapped in 1948. The vessel was named after the Argentine province of Santa Cruz, and is the ninth Argentine naval ship with this name.

Design 

Santa Cruz was a tanker built at the Fairfield Shipbuilding and Engineering Company shipyard at Govan, Scotland, United Kingdom. She had a metal hull and superstructure, two masts, and a single funnel.

She was powered by a three-cylinder triple expansion marine steam engine, with two oil-fired boilers, generating 8,500 HP.

History 

The tanker Santa Cruz was ordered by the Argentine Naval Commission in London by direct contract with Fairfield Shipbuilding and Engineering Company shipyard, signed in November 1920; the cost was £345,000 STG. The name was assigned by decree OG 101/921 on 6 June 1921.

Santa Cruz was launched on 22 June 1921, completed in November, and arrived in Buenos Aires on 28 December 1921 with an Argentine Navy crew led by Frigate Captain Pedro Casal. She was transferred on 16 January 1922 to Yacimientos Petroliferos Fiscales (YPF) with the same name, serving in the YPF fleet until struck in 1948. 
On 13 October 1942 her crew rescued survivors from the American Liberty ship John Carter Rose sunk by the German submarine U-201 about 620 nmi (1,150 km; 710 mi) east of Trinidad.

Santa Cruz was scrapped in 1948, at Campana, Argentina.

See also 
 List of ships of the Argentine Navy

References

Notes

Bibliography

Other sources

Further reading 

 

Auxiliary ships of the Argentine Navy
Ships built in Govan
1921 ships